Nathan Young (born November 18, 2002) is a Canadian curler from Torbay, Newfoundland and Labrador. He currently skips his own team on the World Curling Tour.

Career
Young and his team have been competing together from a very young age. It was in 2015 when the rink claimed their first provincial championship in the U16 NLCA Provincials. From that point on it would be a few more years until the quartet won another provincial championship as they went straight up into competing with the U18 age group afterwards.

In 2020, Young won his first provincial championship in the U18 category. Alongside Joel Krats who they picked up for the tournament due to Ben Stringer being aged out, they beat Team Liam Quinlan 8-1 in the finals to qualify for the Canadian U18 Curling Championships which was subsequently cancelled due to the outbreak of COVID-19. As well as that, Young competed in the 2020 Winter Youth Olympics as a mixed doubles curler representing Canada with Laura Nagy who was representing Hungary. The duo ended up claiming the gold medal in a 9-5 victory in the finals.

In 2021, he started off the year by competing in the 2021 Newfoundland and Labrador Tankard to try and compete in the 2021 Tim Hortons Brier. He would end up falling short of the playoffs and finish in the standings with a 3-4 record. Towards the end of the year though, he got to take his team to the 2021 World Junior Qualification Event, representing Newfoundland and Labrador for a chance to be Team Canada in the 2022 World Junior Curling Championships. They fell one point short losing to Nova Scotia's Owen Purcell in the finals.

In 2022, he once again started off the year by competing in the 2022 Newfoundland and Labrador Tankard. This year though, they won all of their round robin games to send them straight to the finals. They ended up defeating defending tankard champion Greg Smith in the finals to qualify themselves for their first ever brier. In the 2022 Tim Hortons Brier they were easily the youngest team at the competition. While they did finish the tournament with a 1-7 record, his team broke the record for the youngest curler in brier history when alternate player Nicholas Codner stepped in on their game against Kevin Koe to play at only 15-years-old. To add to this year, he also won every game in the 2022 U21 Newfoundland and Labrador Provincials to qualify themselves for the 2022 Canadian Junior Curling Championships when they beat Team Sean O'Leary in the finals. There, his team went 7–1 in the round robin before losing in the quarterfinals to eventual champions Ontario's Landan Rooney.

Personal life
As of 2023, Young is a bachelor of commerce and arts student at Memorial University of Newfoundland.

Teams

References

2002 births
Living people
Canadian male curlers
Curlers from Newfoundland and Labrador
Sportspeople from St. John's, Newfoundland and Labrador
Pan Continental curling champions
Memorial University of Newfoundland alumni
Curlers at the 2020 Winter Youth Olympics